Bronkhorstspruit is a town 50 km east of Pretoria, Gauteng, South Africa along the N4 highway towards Witbank. It also includes three townships called Zithobeni, Rethabiseng and Ekangala. On 18 May 2011, the Tshwane Metropolitan Municipality took over the municipal administration from the abolished Kungwini Local Municipality, which makes Bronkhorstspruit part of Tshwane.

History

In 1858, a group of Voortrekkers settled beside the Bronkhorst Spruit creek, which was originally called Kalkoenkransrivier ('turkey cliff river'). The town was laid out on land of the farm Hondsrivier in 1904 owned by C.J.G. Erasmus and was initially named after him. It adopted the name Bronkhorstspruit in 1935.

On 20 December 1880 it was the scene of the Battle of Bronkhorstspruit, an important event in the early days of the First Boer War when a Boer Commando ambushed a British army column, 94th Regiment of Foot, near the present town en route from Lydenburg to Pretoria.

There is disagreement about where the town got its name from. Some believe it was named after the farmer J.G. Bronkhorst, while others say that it was named after the plant, bronkors (Afrikaans for watercress), that grew in the region of the creek.

Bronkhorstspruit was the seat of the Metsweding District Municipality as well as the Kungwini Local Municipality. Then, on the day of South Africa's 2011 general elections (18 May 2011), the entire Metsweding District ceased to be its own municipality and became part of the Tshwane Metropolitan Municipality.

Parks and greenspace
Ten kilometers to the south of the town lies the Bronkhorstspruit Dam.

Suburbs
Erasmus
Masada
Riamar Park
Bester Park
Cultura Park
Bronkhorstbaai

Economy

Agriculture
Being an agricultural area, maize, sorghum, groundnuts, sunflower seeds, sheep and cattle are grown and raised.

Mining
Fire clay is as well as coal mined in the area.

Places of interest

Cultura Park, a suburb of Bronkhorstspruit, hosts the largest Buddhist temple in Africa. Nan Hua Temple houses the South African headquarters of the Humanistic Buddhist order.

References

External links
Bronkhorstspruit Information

Populated places established in 1858
Populated places in the City of Tshwane
Populated places founded by Afrikaners